Union Church of Dunnigan (also known as Dunnigan Community Church) is a historic church located at 3615 County Road 89A in Dunnigan, California. The Gothic Revival church construction began in 1892, and was completed in 1894. Its design features pointed arch windows and doorways and a louvered bell tower with a working bell. As a union church, the church was not connected to any specific denomination and was instead used for all community religious functions. In addition to services for the community's various congregations, the church hosted visiting preachers, weddings, funerals, baptisms, and a yearly Christmas bazaar during the 1960s and 1970s.

The church was added to the National Register of Historic Places in 2003.

References

Churches in California
Churches on the National Register of Historic Places in California
Carpenter Gothic church buildings in California
Churches completed in 1892
Buildings and structures in Yolo County, California
National Register of Historic Places in Yolo County, California